Middleton is a settlement and civil parish in Northumberland, England.  The parish is situated on the North Sea coast, south of the island of Lindisfarne, and contains the villages of Ross, Detchant and Elwick; all are shrunken medieval villages.  Both the A1 London to Edinburgh road and East Coast Main Line pass through the parish.  In the 2001 census the parish had a population of 136, falling to 115 at the 2011 Census.

Governance 
The parish is in the parliamentary constituency of Berwick-upon-Tweed.

Landmarks 
The causeway is a Roman road which starts at Port Gate on Hadrian's Wall, north of Corbridge, and extends  northwards across Northumberland to the mouth of the River Tweed at Berwick-upon-Tweed.

Middleton Hall is a Grade II listed Tudor style mansion. After World War II it was sold to the Greenwich Hospital Trust. It has since been restored as a private residence.

References

External links 

 Local History: Belford with Middleton, Northumberland

Villages in Northumberland
Civil parishes in Northumberland